Tağı Tağıyev (7 November 1917 – 27 June 1993) was a painter and People's Artist of the Azerbaijan SSR.

Biography
Taghi Taghiyev was born on November 11, 1917 in Baku. He studied at Technical School of Art in Baku in 1931-1935. Later he studied at Surikov Moscow Art Institute in 1940-1941. He is the author of thematic picture, still life, portraits, landscapes and home scenes. Taghiyev is more famous as a portrait master. He is also known as one of the creators of realist painting in Azerbaijan. Main themes in his works is the history and historical personalities, laborers, and the nature. Taghi Taghiyev had been in many countries as Turkey, Greece, Italy, Spain, France and created many paintings about their life. His first exhibition in Baku hold in 1962. "Childhood Memories", "Absheron Series" and the other famous paintings of the artist were demonstrated in Prague, Pekin, Dakar, Baghdad and other cities. "Gara Garayev", "Sattar Bahlulzade", "Bahruz Kangarli" (1947), "Kamil Khanlarov", "Soltan Mahammad", "Maral Rahmanzadeh" are the most known works of Taghi Taghiyev. He went on a trip to countries of Europe and Africa in 1954 and created many paintings of his impressions as "African Girl", "Hello, New World".

Taghi Taghiyev's paintings are displayed in State Museum of Oriental Art (Moscow), National Art Museum of Azerbaijan named after Rustam Mustafayev, Azerbaijan State Art Gallery and other museums. He was awarded the title of Honorary Artist and People's Artist of the Azerbaijan SSR (December 1, 1982).

The painter died on June 27, 1993 in Baku. March 29, 2013 - Anniversary Exhibition and June 8, 2018 - 100th Anniversary Exhibition were held at the National Art Museum of Azerbaijan.

References

Azerbaijani painters
Landscape painters
20th-century painters
Soviet painters
1917 births
1993 deaths
Artists from Baku
Portrait painters
People's Artists of Azerbaijan